The Central Unit of Valle del Cauca, also called UCEVA, is a public, departmental, coeducational university based in the city of Tuluá, Valle del Cauca, Colombia.

See also

 List of universities in Colombia

References

External links
 Central University of Valle del Cauca official site 

Universities and colleges in Colombia
Educational institutions established in 1971